Lundh is a surname. Notable people with the surname include:

Alexander Lundh (born 1986), Swedish motorcycle racer
Anna Lundh (born 1987), Swedish television personality, adventurer and model
Carl Lundh (1866–1942), Norwegian barrister
Charles Lundh (1856–1908), Norwegian painter
Daniel Lundh, Franco-Swedish actor and writer
Emma Lundh (born 1989), Swedish footballer
Fredrik Lundh Sammeli (born 1977), Swedish politician
Gregers Lundh (1786–1836), Norwegian military officer and academic
Henrik Lundh (1894–1985), Norwegian civil servant
Jonas Lundh (born 1965), Swedish abstract expressionist artist
Nils Lundh (1921–2005), Swedish ski jumper
Olof Lundh (born 1966), Swedish sports journalist
Patrik Lundh (born 1988), Swedish ice hockey player
Per Lundh (born 1958), Swedish sprint canoer
Stephan Lundh (born 1959), Swedish hockey coach
Yngve Lundh (1924–2017), Swedish cyclist